The 1925 Georgetown Blue and Gray football team represented Georgetown University during the 1925 college football season. Led by Lou Little in his second season as head coach, the team went 9–1.

Schedule

References

Georgetown
Georgetown Hoyas football seasons
Georgetown Blue and Gray football